The Next Best Thing is a 2000 romantic comedy film.

The Next Best Thing may also refer to
The Next Best Thing (TV series), a 2007 American reality television series
The Next Best Thing (album), a 2004 release by Ray Wilson 
"The Next Best Thing", a 2004 song by All Time Low